Ben Relles (born 1975) is an American businessman.  He was formerly the Head of Comedy at YouTube, as part of the company's YouTube Originals program. In this role, he oversaw development of new content from YouTube's top comedy talent. Currently, he is working with LinkedIn co-founder Reid Hoffman. Prior to joining YouTube, he was Vice President of Programming at Next New Networks.

Relles was the creator of the comedy network Barely Political, whose content had been viewed over 2.5 billion times. Ben started the channel when he created the "Obama Girl" series of videos. He continued to oversee the Barely Political comedy network, which featured the shows The Key of Awesome, Super Therapy, and Auto-Tune the News. He also developed the Vsauce network with Michael Stevens which had a combined 1 billion views across Vsauce1, Vsauce2, and Vsauce3.

He received his MBA in Marketing from the Wharton School of Business.

References

Obama Meets With YouTube Advisors On How To Reach Online Audiences
FOX Business: The Willis Report
UW Alumni Association: Ben Relles, 2013 Forward Under 40 Award Honoree
Fast Company: How the Next Lab Can Quadruple Your Subscribers
NATPE Daily: Developing for Digital
Anderson Cooper Show: YouTube Guest Ben Relles
20/20: The Key of Awesome
CurrentTV: The Obama Girl
C-SPAN: Interview with Ben Relles
Huffington Post: A Crush on Obama and an Eye on the Prize
On Wisconsin Magazine: E-lectorate
ABC News: Obama Girl, Caught

1975 births
University of Wisconsin–Madison alumni
Living people
Wharton School of the University of Pennsylvania alumni
21st-century American businesspeople